The legality of polygamy in the United States is that the practice is a crime and punishable by a fine, imprisonment, or both, according to the law of the individual state and the circumstances of the offense. Polygamy was outlawed in federal territories by the Edmunds Act, and there are laws against the practice in all 50 states, as well as the District of Columbia, Guam, and Puerto Rico. Because state laws exist, polygamy is not actively prosecuted at the federal level.

Many US courts (e.g. Turner v. S., 212 Miss. 590, 55 So.2d 228) treat bigamy as a strict liability crime: in some jurisdictions, a person can be convicted of a felony even if he reasonably believed he had only one legal spouse. For example, if a person has the mistaken belief that their previous spouse is dead or that their divorce is final, they can still be convicted of bigamy if they marry a new person.

Federal law
According to the Edmunds Act, bigamy is punishable by "a fine of not more than five hundred dollars and by imprisonment for a term of not more than five years". However, because state laws exist, polygamy is not actively prosecuted at the federal level, but the practice is considered "against public policy".

Cohabitation clause
Several states have a cohabitation clause, including cohabitation within the state as a criterion for the crime. For people who have entered a polygamous marriage outside the state, such clause makes it possible to be punished again if they move to the state and cohabit, but on the other hand it can protect them if they only visit the state without cohabiting. In contrast, for states without a cohabitation clause, visitors having entered polygamy outside the state can possibly be charged with felony within the state, since the Double Jeopardy Clause (that can prevent an accused person from being tried again on the same charges following a conviction or acquittal) is not guaranteed to legally protect such visitors, as the jurisdiction is not the same as the one where they entered the polygamous relationship.

By state
In Utah, polygamy is treated as an infraction, which is punishable by a fine up to $750, compensatory service, forfeiture, disqualification, or a combination of those punishments. In other states, polygamy is usually punishable by imprisonment and/or a fine.

History
Couples have married in the United States for centuries. For most of US history, marriages were solemnized in an ecclesiastical setting. Government-issued marriage licenses are a modern innovation. Even before the advent of licensing, many states enacted laws to prohibit plural marriage style relationships. Early Mormons were persecuted for their practice of polygamy. No state permits its citizens to enter into more than one concurrent,  it is a 
legally-licensed marriage.  People who attempt to, or are able to, secure a second marriage license are generally prosecuted for bigamy. The terms "bigamy" and "polygamy" are sometimes confused or used interchangeably. Some states' statutes refer to polygamy while others use the bigamy term. Criminal sentences differ widely. Prosecutions for either violation are extremely rare. Polygamy is a practice difficult to define since it virtually never occurs in the context of legal licensing. Given that Mormon polygamists migrated to the Rocky Mountains in 1847, partly to escape prosecution for polygamy in the eastern states, efforts to curb the practice focused intensely on Utah and the surrounding territories in the 1800s. Utah and four other western territories were constrained to incorporate a prohibition against plural marriages in their state constitutions.

Given that almost no polygamists bother to seek a second marriage license, the practice of forming a family with more than one spousal-styled relationship is very difficult to criminalize. In the majority of cases, the additional partner is considered a wife in the context of religious beliefs. Legally speaking, the practice is more akin to adultery. Criminal prosecutions of adultery are rare in the United States, though it remains a crime in several states.

Utah made the practice of polygamy a felony in 1935, after the Church of Jesus Christ of Latter-Day Saints publicly repudiated it in 1890, in a document labeled 'The Manifesto'. They similarly repudiated it in 1904 and 1910. Many convictions followed. Since the 1960s, polygamy prosecutions have been rare. Prosecutions included Robert D. Foster, Steve Bronson, Mark Easterday, Thomas Green, and Rodney Holm. The latter two prompted state supreme court challenges. Both failed. Nevertheless, Utah has remained reluctant to pursue prosecutions, citing a lack of resources, difficulties obtaining convincing evidence, and an understanding that any prosecution would trigger an inevitable appeal to the higher courts. The Supreme Court's 2003 Lawrence v. Texas ruling found that all adult, consensual, non-commercial sexual activity is protected, thus weakening any attempts to prosecute families for private residential or sexual arrangements that did not seek the imprimatur of the state.

On December 13, 2013, a federal judge, spurred by the American Civil Liberties Union and other groups, struck down the parts of Utah's bigamy law that criminalized cohabitation, while also acknowledging that the state may still enforce bans on having multiple marriage licenses. The state of Utah appealed the decision, arguing that polygamist Kody Brown (whose relationships were documented in the show Sister Wives) lacked standing to bring his civil suit, since his county prosecutor, Jeff Buhman, had not followed through on any plan to prosecute the Brown family. The Tenth Circuit Court of Appeals (Denver) agreed with Utah and overturned the previous decision, thus effectively recriminalizing polygamy as a felony.

In 2020, State Senator Deidre Henderson introduced a bill reducing the penalty for polygamy from a five-year prison sentence (as a felony) to an infraction. The bill passed with overwhelming support in Utah's House and Senate. As such, polygamy was downgraded from a felony to an infraction, but it remains a felony if force, threats or other abuses are involved.

Federal legislation to outlaw the practice in federal territories was endorsed as constitutional in 1878, despite the religious objections of the Church of Jesus Christ of Latter-day Saints (Mormons), by the Supreme Court, in Reynolds v. United States.

Individualist feminism and advocates such as Wendy McElroy and journalist Jillian Keenan support the freedom for adults to voluntarily enter polygamous marriages.

Authors such as Alyssa Rower and Samantha Slark argue that there is a case for legalizing polygamy on the basis of regulation and monitoring of the practice, legally protecting the polygamous partners and allowing them to join mainstream society instead of forcing them to hide from it when any public situation arises.

In an October 2004 op-ed for USA Today, George Washington University law professor Jonathan Turley argued that, as a simple matter of equal treatment under law, polygamy ought to be legal. Acknowledging that underage girls are sometimes coerced into polygamous marriages, Turley replied that "banning polygamy is no more a solution to child abuse than banning marriage would be a solution to spousal abuse".

Stanley Kurtz, an American conservative fellow at the Hudson Institute, rejects the decriminalization and legalization of polygamy. He stated:

In January 2015, Pastor Neil Patrick Carrick of Detroit, Michigan, brought a case (Carrick v. Snyder) against the State of Michigan that the state's ban of polygamy violates the Free Exercise and Equal Protection Clause of the U.S. Constitution.

 some conservative Muslims in the U.S. engaged in polygamous relationships in which each had one wife with a legal marriage and others with only religious marriages. Around that time a phenomenon of polygamy occurred among Muslims in Philadelphia who were black.

Notes

See also
 Legality of polygamy
 Polygamy in North America
 Polygamy in Christianity

References

Further reading
 
 

Polygamy law in the United States